Stringozzi  or Strangozzi  is an Italian wheat pasta, among the more notable of those produced in the Umbria region. The long, rectangular cross-section noodles are made by hand and generally served with the local black truffles, a meat ragù or a tomato-based sauce. The name of the pasta is drawn from its resemblance to shoelaces, as stringhe is Italian for '"strings".

References

Types of pasta
Cuisine of Umbria